Helmut Burk is a Grammy Award-winning classical recording engineer and producer. He has worked extensively for the German classical record label, Deutsche Grammophon, and has recorded artists such as Krystian Zimerman, Yuja Wang, Herbert von Karajan, Yundi Li, Maria Joao Pires, Gidon Kremer, Pierre Boulez, Leonard Bernstein, Claudio Arrau, and numerous others.

References

Living people
Audio production engineers
Year of birth missing (living people)
Place of birth missing (living people)